Barani may refer to:

Places
 Barani, Golestan, a village in Golestan Province, Iraq
 Barani, Hormozgan, a village in Hormozgan Province, Iran
 Barani, Lorestan, a village in Lorestan Province, Iran
 Barani, Sistan and Baluchestan, a village in Sistan and Baluchestan Province, Iran
 Barani Department, in Burkina Faso
 Barani-ye Ajam, a village in West Azerbaijan Province, Iran
 Barani-ye Kord, a village in West Azerbaijan Province, Iran

Other uses
 Barani, an honourable title given to the warriors or kings in ancient Tamil Nadu for having killed thousand elephants in war
 Barani (website), website devoted to the history of Aboriginal people in the City of Sydney area
 Barani land, a term used for the rain-fed agricultural land in India
 Vipera barani, a venomous snake endemic to Turkey 
 Ziauddin Barani  (1285–1358 CE), a Muslim political thinker of the Delhi Sultanate (in present-day Northern India)

See also
 Berani flip, an acrobatic flip used in gymnastics and martial arts